The 9th BRDC International Trophy was a motor race, run to Formula One rules, held on 14 September 1957 at Silverstone Circuit, Northamptonshire. The race was run over two 15 lap heats and a 35 lap final, and was won by French driver Jean Behra in a BRM P25.

The field also included several Formula Two cars, highest finisher being Roy Salvadori in a Cooper T43, finishing in eighth place overall.

Results

Entry list
Note: a blue background indicates a car running under Formula 2 regulations.

Notes:

1Roy Salvadori drove the works' Cooper number 35, which had been entered for John Cooper, who did not take part.

2Jack Brabham drove car number 14 in place of Salvadori.

3Graham Hill drove car number 34 in place of Brabham.

Heats

Notes:

1 Tony Brooks took over Fairman's car in order to qualify for the final

2 Cliff Allison took over Taylor's car in order to qualify for the final

Final
Note: a blue background indicates a car running under Formula 2 regulations.

References 

BRDC International Trophy
BRDC International Trophy
BRDC International Trophy
BRDC International Trophy